Scott Alan Hastings (born June 3, 1960) is an American former player in the National Basketball Association (NBA). His career spanned from 1982–1993 and he played forward/center for the New York Knicks, Atlanta Hawks, Miami Heat, Detroit Pistons and Denver Nuggets. He played college basketball for the Arkansas Razorbacks.

College
Born in Independence, Kansas, Hastings played college basketball at the University of Arkansas from 1978–1982. While there, he was initiated into the Lambda Chi Alpha fraternity.

While being a heavily recruited athlete Hastings had a choice between the University of Kansas (in his home state) or the University of Arkansas. He chose the University of Arkansas.

NBA
He was selected in the second round (29th overall) by the New York Knicks in the 1982 NBA Draft. He was a member of the 1990 Detroit Pistons NBA championship team.

He holds the NBA record for most games in a row without a steal at 65 straight games. This spanned over a 3 year long period from 1989–1992.

After basketball
Hastings hosts a daily radio show with Tyler Polumbus, and Josh Dover on Altitude Sports Radio 92.5 FM from 10-2KKSE. Previously, he hosted a radio-show with co-hosts Drew Goodman and Sandy Clough on Sportsradio KKFN 104.3 The Fan in Denver, Colorado until 2016. Prior to 2012, Hastings co-hosted shows with Mike Evans and Alfred Williams. He also provides television color commentary for the Denver Nuggets on the Altitude Sports and Entertainment cable TV network, working alongside Chris Marlowe and Katie Winge. He also hosts a golf show on Altitude during the NBA off-season.

Hastings previously spent 12 years hosting the Sports Zoo with Dave Logan on 850 KOA and served as the Denver Broncos' radio analyst from 1997 to 2004, including the team's appearances in Super Bowl XXXII and Super Bowl XXXIII.

External links 
Scott Hastings' bio on Sports Radio 1043thefan.com
NBA stats @ basketball-reference.com
Scott Hastings leaves 850KOA

1960 births
Living people
American men's basketball players
Arkansas Razorbacks men's basketball players
Atlanta Hawks players
Basketball players from Kansas
Centers (basketball)
College football announcers
Denver Broncos announcers
Denver Nuggets announcers
Denver Nuggets players
Detroit Pistons players
Miami Heat expansion draft picks
Miami Heat players
New York Knicks draft picks
New York Knicks players
People from Independence, Kansas
Power forwards (basketball)
Basketball players from Denver
Sportspeople from Denver